Waghala may refer to: waghala is small town near Wardha Maharashtra . Poor place to survive

Places
Waghala, Nanded district, a village in Nanded district in Maharashtra state in India
Waghala, Parbhani district, a village in Parbhani district in Maharashtra state in India